Biechowo refers to the following places in Poland:

 Biechowo, Greater Poland Voivodeship
 Biechowo, Kuyavian-Pomeranian Voivodeship